Columbia University has two senior societies, the Senior Society of Nacoms and the Senior Society of Sachems. Founded in 1898 and 1915, respectively, each society taps fifteen juniors each year, often the most influential student leaders on campus. Members of the societies can be identified by rings worn on their little fingers: gold rings with thirteen black diamonds on them worn on the left hand by Nacoms, and green zigzag-patterned rings worn on the right hand by Sachems. Both societies are allegedly dedicated to performing "discrete service" to Columbia College in cooperation with the school administration. They have been known to elect faculty as honorary members.

The Nacoms appear to be incorporated in New York as a 501(c)(4) educational service organization.

History 
The Nacoms were founded in 1898, with the object of "bring[ing] together in their junior year a few of the men in each class, who have done the most for the University, and at the same time stand well in their college work", with the hope "that the society will have a beneficial influence in college affairs". Its name is a reference to the nacom, a Maya official that served as the principal military head of the Mayan city-state, and who, according to the Relación de las cosas de Yucatán by Diego de Landa, was charged with cutting open and removing the heart of the victim during human sacrifice. Though from the beginning it was intended to have fifteen members each year, for its first year, several tapped students were unable to join on account of the organization's secrecy, so it started with twelve members from each class.

The Sachems were founded in 1915 as a protest group against the Nacoms, allegedly for the latter's reticence toward Jewish students. The publicly stated reason for their formation, however, was that it was in response to Columbia's growing class size, when it was judged that only one senior society would not adequately to serve the needs of the university's undergraduate student body. A Sachem was a paramount chief among the Algonquins, but the term also referred to the leader of the New York City political machine Tammany Hall.

Until 1951, both societies published the names of their newly elected members in the Columbia Daily Spectator, as well as in The New York Times on occasions. 

Controversy surrounding the roles and secrecy of the senior societies cropped up in 1954. Students complained about the societies' failure to comply with the university's regulations surrounding student organizations. While all groups were required to be under the jurisdiction of, and responsible to, the Committee on Student Organizations (CSO), the Nacoms were not registered with the committee and were therefore exempt. Additionally, neither society had given copies of their constitutions to the committee or made the purposes of their organizations clear, as was required, and their secrecy made it impossible to discern whether they "conduct[ed] their meetings and programs in a responsible manner as members of the University community". The Columbia College student body voted in May of that year to recommend to the university administration that it compel the senior societies to register with the CSO, 832 to 447, as well as force it to submit monthly reports on their activities to the dean of the college, 663 to 599.

In January 1955, both societies were placed under the direct jurisdiction of the Dean's Office, bypassing the CSO. Their secrecy was not abolished, and the deans announced that they did not intend to ask for monthly reports. At the time, four deans were honorary members of either the Nacoms or Sachems.

It was reported in 1984 by The New York Times that the Nacoms initiate their members through a ceremony in which members wear robes and hold candles while leading blindfolded initiates through an obstacle course in St. Paul's Chapel, while the Sachems initiate theirs with a champagne party. Each society is supported by a "modest" endowment, though when asked by The New York Times, neither of the deans of students of Columbia College or the School of Engineering would comment on the sizes of said endowments.

Various political figures have been accused of being members of either the Nacoms or Sachems, but given the secrecy of both groups, such accusations have been difficult to verify.

See also 

 Collegiate secret societies in North America
 St. Anthony Hall

References 

Collegiate secret societies
Student organizations established in 1898
Student organizations established in 1915
Columbia University student organizations